Brandon Coleman (born June 22, 1992) is a former American football wide receiver. He played college football at Rutgers. He signed with the New Orleans Saints as an undrafted free agent after the 2014 NFL Draft.

Early years
Coleman attended Bishop McNamara High School in Forestville, Maryland. As a senior, he had 41 receptions for 838 yards and 10 touchdowns.

College career
As a sophomore at Rutgers in 2012, Coleman had 43 receptions for 718 yards and 10 touchdowns. The following season, Coleman recorded 34 receptions, 538 yards, and 4 touchdowns his junior year with the Scarlet Knights. Coleman entered the 2014 NFL Draft after his junior season, however went undrafted.

Professional career
On May 10, 2014, he signed with the New Orleans Saints as an undrafted free agent.

Coleman received his first professional starts during the Saint's 2015 season opener against the Arizona Cardinals. He caught his first career touchdown on a 12-yard pass from Drew Brees in the second quarter. He finished his first career game hauling in 4 receptions for 41-yards. During a Week 13 matchup against the division-rival Carolina Panthers, he made 4 receptions for 73 receiving yards and caught his second career touchdown reception. On January 3, 2016, Coleman caught a season-high 5 passes for 81 receiving yards against the Atlanta Falcons.

He finished his second season with 30 receptions, 454 receiving yards, and two touchdowns.

In Week 2 of the 2017 season against the New England Patriots, Coleman had four receptions for 82 yards and a touchdown in the 36–20 loss. He finished the season with 23 receptions for 364 yards and three touchdowns.

On April 18, 2018, Coleman re-signed with the Saints. He was released with a failed physical on August 5, 2018.

On September 2, 2019, Brandon Coleman announced his retirement via an Instagram post.

References

External links
Rutgers Scarlet Knights bio 

1992 births
Living people
People from Accokeek, Maryland
Players of American football from Maryland
American football wide receivers
Rutgers Scarlet Knights football players
New Orleans Saints players
People from Forestville, Maryland